Children's Hospital at Erlanger is a 118-bed, tertiary care children's hospital located in Chattanooga, Tennessee. The hospital serves as the pediatric center of excellence for Erlanger Health System, the tenth largest public health system in the United States. Children's Hospital at Erlanger treats infants, children, teens, and young adults aged 0-21. It is located adjacent to Erlanger Baroness Hospital, just east of downtown Chattanooga.

History 

The initiative to create a hospital in Chattanooga for children was spearheaded in the 1920s by the city's former mayor, T.C. Thompson, working closely with the local Civitan Club. Through a $250,000 bond issue, the original children's hospital was completed in 1929 in Chattanooga's Glenwood community. The facility had 89 beds for children and 16 beds for newborn babies. After several years, the children's hospital board merged with the Erlanger hospital board, and the facility was named T.C. Thompson Children's Hospital.

During the 1940s, the hospital pioneered new polio treatments, including hydrotherapy, and opened the region's first unit for premature babies. In 1975, a move to Erlanger's downtown campus made way for the region's first pediatric intensive care unit and Neonatal Intensive Care Unit (NICU). The 2000s saw a tripling of the ER size, renovated surgical suites and expanded operating rooms. In 2011, the hospital was renamed Children's Hospital at Erlanger to better reflect its role in the region, and as part of Erlanger Health System. With this change, hospital would continue to honor its founder by naming its downtown pediatric location, the "T.C. Thompson Campus."

In 2014, Erlanger leadership unveiled a 20-year plan for the largest expansion in the health system's history. The plans include a 100,000-foot children's and women's ambulatory center, and a new state-of-the-art children's and women's hospital.

December 2018 marked the opening of a 90,000-square-foot pediatric outpatient facility, the Kennedy Outpatient Center. The center represents phase one of plans for a new Children's Hospital, part of a multi-year re-imagining of Erlanger's downtown campus.

About

Overview 
Founded in 1929, Children's Hospital at Erlanger serves the medical needs of infants, children and adolescents in a 31,400 square-mile region of Southeast Tennessee, North Georgia, North Alabama, and Western North Carolina. The hospital is a Comprehensive Regional Pediatric Center (CRPC), designated by the state of Tennessee to function at the highest level of pediatric medical and trauma care. It is one of four CRPCs in Tennessee.

In addition to providing general pediatric care, Children's Hospital has a board-certified medical staff representing 14 pediatric subspecialties (children's medical specialties). Critical care services for children include a 24/7 pediatric emergency department, a pediatric intensive care unit (PICU), and a Level IV neonatal intensive care unit (NICU) for premature and sick infants.

Academic mission 
Children's Hospital at Erlanger is a pediatric teaching hospital through Erlanger Health System's affiliation with the University of Tennessee College of Medicine. Children's Hospital physicians serve as the pediatrics department for the medical school, providing both specialty and subspecialty training.

Pediatric specialties 

General Pediatrics
Adolescent Medicine
Anesthesia
Behavioral Health
Cardiology
Critical Care
Dermatology
Developmental Behavioral Pediatrics
Endocrinology
Gastroenterology
Genetics
Hematology/Oncology
Infectious Disease
Neonatology
Nephrology & Hypertension
Neurology
Neurosurgery
Orthopaedics
Pulmonology
Radiology
Surgery
Urology

Ancillary services 

Child Life Program
 Childhood Healthy Eating and Active Living Center
 Cystic Fibrosis Center
 Social Services

Children’s Miracle Network 
Children's Hospital at Erlanger is a member of Children's Miracle Network Hospitals, an alliance of 170 children's hospitals in North America. The network's mission is to raise funds and awareness for local children's hospitals.

Admissions 
In fiscal year 2014–2015, 3,782 children were admitted to Children's Hospital and more than 47,118 were treated in the emergency department, outpatient surgery, and outpatient clinics.

See also 

 List of children's hospitals in the United States

References

External links 

 http://www.childrensaterlanger.org

Children's hospitals in the United States
Hospitals in Tennessee
Buildings and structures in Chattanooga, Tennessee